Gordon Martel is emeritus professor of history at the University of Northern British Columbia and adjunct professor at the University of Victoria. Martel is a specialist in the history of modern warfare and edited The Encyclopedia of War (2012). Martel was one of the founding editors of The International History Review, and is co-editor of the book series Seminar Studies in History and editor of the series Short Histories of Big Ideas.

In 2006, Martel revised and expanded James Joll's The Origins of the First World War.

Selected publications

1980s
Imperial Diplomacy: Rosebery and the Failure of Foreign Policy. Mansell Publishing, 1986. 
The Origins of the First World War. Longman, 1987. (Seminar Studies In History)

1990s
Modern Germany Reconsidered: 1870-1945. Routledge, 1992. (Editor)
American Foreign Relations Reconsidered: 1890-1993. Routledge, 1994. (Editor)
Origins of the Second World War Reconsidered: A.J.P. Taylor and the Historians. Routledge, 1999. (Editor)

2000s
The Times and Appeasement: The Journals of A. L. Kennedy, 1932-1939. Cambridge University Press, 2001. (Camden Fifth Series) 
The World War Two Reader. Routledge, 2004. (Editor) (Routledge Readers in History) 
A Companion to Europe 1900-1945. Wiley-Blackwell, 2005. (Editor) (Blackwell Companions to European History) 
The Origins of the First World War. Routledge, 2006. (With James Joll) (Origins Of Modern Wars) 
A Companion to International History 1900-2001. Wiley-Blackwell, 2007. (Editor) (Blackwell Companions to History) 
The Encyclopedia of War. Wiley-Blackwell, 2012. (Editor) 
The Month that Changed the World: July 1914. 2014. 
Twentieth-Century War and Conflict: A Concise Encyclopedia. Wiley-Blackwell, 2014. (Editor)

References 

Academic staff of the University of Northern British Columbia
Academic staff of the University of Victoria
Living people
Year of birth missing (living people)